Kurnosov is a Russian masculine surname, its feminine counterpart is Kurnosova. It may refer to
Igor Kurnosov (1985–2013), Russian chess grandmaster
Kristina Kurnosova (born 1997), Russian volleyball player
Natalya Kurnosova (born 1975), Russian volleyball player, mother of Kristina

Russian-language surnames